Colombier or Colombiers may refer to:

Places

France
Colombier, Saint Barthélemy, Saint Barthélemy
Colombier, Allier, in the Allier département 
Colombier, Côte-d'Or, in the Côte-d'Or département 
Colombier, Dordogne, in the Dordogne département 
Colombier, Haute-Saône, in the Haute-Saône département 
Colombier, Loire, in the Loire département 
Colombier-en-Brionnais, in the Saône-et-Loire département 
Colombier-Fontaine, in the Doubs département 
Colombier-le-Cardinal, in the Ardèche département 
Colombier-le-Jeune, in the Ardèche département 
Colombier-le-Vieux, in the Ardèche département 
Colombier-Saugnieu, in the Rhône département

Communes in France
Colombiers, Charente-Maritime, in the Charente-Maritime département 
Colombiers, Cher, in the Cher département 
Colombiers, Hérault, in the Hérault département 
Colombiers, Orne, in the Orne département
Colombiers, Vienne, in the Vienne département
Colombiers-du-Plessis, in the Mayenne département 
Colombiers-sur-Seulles, in the Calvados département

Switzerland
Colombier, Neuchâtel, in Neuchâtel canton.
Colombier, Vaud, in Vaud canton.

Canada
Colombier, Quebec, Canada

Other
Colombier, another name for the wine grape Colombard
Colombier, a dovecote
Colombier, a large size of paper
Colombier Castle, a castle in Colombier, Neuchâtel, Switzerland
FC Colombier, association football team from Colombier, Switzerland
 Jean Colombier (born 1945), French writer
Mont Colombier, a mountain in Savoie, France